Siahbil or Siah Bil may refer to:
 Siahbil, Gil Dulab, Rezvanshahr County
 Siah Bil, Khoshabar, Rezvanshahr County
 Siah Bil Khushaber, Rezvanshahr County
 Siah Bil, Talesh